Daniel A. Haskett (born August 20, 1952) is an American veteran animator who, according to Variety, was one of a "group of young animators trained by Disney's 'Nine Old Men' that were confined to one small room in the Disney Feature Animation Building in the 1970s."

He started his career in 1969 when he graduated from the High School of Art and Design, and the first thing he did was a commercial for a coffee called Brim, and, according to him, it was "very psychedelic".

Haskett was worried when he first entered the company in 1977 due to Disney's reputation at that time.

He designed the character Belle for Disney’s Beauty and the Beast, as well as Ariel for The Little Mermaid, and Tod as an adult for The Fox and the Hound. Haskett also did earlier designs for Ursula; some were inspired by singer Patti LaBelle, and the character's hair almost looked like fins.

Haskett was the main designer of the characters Minerva Mink for Steven Spielberg's Animaniacs and Radio AAHS's mascot disc jockeys Ozzie and Kazoo. Haskett also has credits for Tom and Jerry: The Movie, Toy Story, The Pagemaster, The Prince of Egypt, Sesame Street and The Simpsons.

He has been drawing characters for Looney Tunes since 1979 and has recently worked as a character designer for the web series Looney Tunes Cartoons.

Notable credits
 Raggedy Ann and Andy: A Musical Adventure (1977) — assistant animator
 Cat's Can (1986, Sesame Street short) — director
 Daffy Duck's Quackbusters (1988) — animator
 The Simpsons (1989) — character designer for Moe Szyslak and Barney Gumble
 The Little Mermaid (1989) — character designer for Ursula and Ariel
 Tiny Toon Adventures (1990) — character designer, most known for Babs
 Beauty and the Beast (1991) — character designer for Belle
 Space Jam: A New Legacy (2021) — animator

References

External links

 Interview with Dan Haskett on SeeingBlack.com
 Daniel A. "Dan" Hasket on The Internet Animation Database

American animators
Walt Disney Animation Studios people
1952 births
Living people
African-American people
High School of Art and Design alumni